Alfred Florian Beiter (July 7, 1894 – March 11, 1974) was an American businessman and politician who served four terms as a United States Representative from New York from 1933 to 1939 and from 1941 to 1943. He was a Democrat.

Biography
Beiter was born the son of Nicholas I and Elizabeth E Wyman Beiter in Clarence, Erie County, New York. He attended Williamsville High School and Niagara University. He married Caroline A. Kibler on November 19, 1919.

Career
After a move to Williamsville, New York, Beiter engaged in the general merchandising business from 1915 to 1929. He was a supervisor of the town of Amherst, New York, from 1930 to 1934.

Congress 
Elected as a Democrat to the Seventy-third and the two succeeding Congresses, Beiter was U. S. Representative for the forty-first district of New York from March 4, 1933, to January 3, 1939; and was chairman of the Committee on War Claims during the Seventy-fifth Congress. An unsuccessful candidate for reelection in 1938 to the Seventy-sixth Congress, he was assistant to the United States Secretary of the Interior in 1939 and 1940. He was then elected to the Seventy-seventh Congress and served from January 3, 1941, to January 3, 1943,  but was an unsuccessful candidate for reelection in 1942 to the Seventy-eighth Congress.

Beiter owned and operated a hatchery and feed business in Buffalo, New York, from 1944 to 1948, and was president of the National Customs Service Association from 1949 to 1961. He finished his career as Deputy Commissioner of Customs for the Treasury Department in Washington, D.C., from 1961 to 1964. He resided in Chevy Chase, Maryland. He moved to Boca Raton, Florida, upon his retirement.

Death
Beiter died in Boca Raton, Palm Beach County, Florida, on March 11, 1974 (age 79 years, 247 days). He is interred at Boca Raton Cemetery, Boca Raton, Florida.

References

External links

1894 births
1974 deaths
Niagara University alumni
People from Clarence, New York
People from Chevy Chase, Maryland
Democratic Party members of the United States House of Representatives from New York (state)
People from Williamsville, New York
People from Boca Raton, Florida
20th-century American politicians
Members of the United States House of Representatives from New York (state)